Mathiang (brown in Dinka) may refer to:

 Mathiang, South Sudan, a boma in Jonglei State, South Sudan
 Mathiang Anyoor (Brown caterpillar), a Dinka-affiliated militia group in South Sudan

People
 Mangok Mathiang (born 1992), Australian-Sudanese basketball player for Hapoel Eilat of the Israeli Basketball Premier League
 Mathiang Yak Anek (fl. 19th century), female Dinka chief and escaped slave
 Mathiang Mathiang (born 1994), South Sudanese footballer
 Mathiang Muo (born 1987), Australian-Sudanese basketball player